The Hobbie Accessible was an American automobile manufactured in Hampton, Iowa from 1908 until 1909.  One of many High wheeler cars produced at the time, it featured a twin-cylinder air-cooled engine, tiller steering, and solid tires.

References

Defunct motor vehicle manufacturers of the United States
Cars introduced in 1908

1900s cars
Brass Era vehicles
Highwheeler